Adarmahān (in Greek sources given as , Adaarmanes; fl. late 6th century) was a Persian general active in the western frontier of the Sassanid Empire against the East Roman (Byzantine) forces, during the Byzantine–Sassanid War of 572–591.

Biography

Adarmahān is recorded as a marzbān (general of a frontier province, "margrave"), probably of Nisibis, by the Syriac historian John of Ephesus. He was posted at Nisibis in 573, when the Persian king, Khosrau I (r. 531–579), sent him at the head of an army to invade the Roman province of Syria. He devastated the province, sacked the city of Apamea, capturing several thousand prisoners, and defeated a small Roman force under general Magnus.

In 577, he raided the Roman province of Osrhoene, but withdrew at the approach of a strong Roman army under general Justinian. In 580, the East Roman general Maurice advanced with an army along the river Euphrates toward the Sassanid capital, Ctesiphon. In response, Adarmahan was ordered to begin operations in northern Mesopotamia (581), threatening the Roman army's supply line and forcing Maurice to stop and withdraw his army north. Adarmahan pillaged Osrhoene, and was successful in capturing its capital, Edessa. Then he marched his army toward Callinicum on the Euphrates. There, however, he was met by Maurice and his army, and suffered a minor defeat which caused him to retreat. In June of the next year (582), Adarmahan suffered a heavy defeat by Maurice near Constantina, barely escaping the field, while his co-commander Tamkhosrau was killed. Thereafter, Adarmahan disappears from history.

References

Sources

6th-century Iranian people
People of the Roman–Sasanian Wars
Sasanian governors of Nisibis
Generals of Khosrow I
Generals of Hormizd IV
Nusaybin